Er.Mohan Acharya is a business man and Nepali politician member of the House of Representatives of the federal parliament. His main aim is for the betterment development of Rasuwa. He focuses in development of Rasuwa.He lives in thousands of hearts of people in Nepal. He's only the key person for the development in Rasuwa. He was elected under the first-past-the-post system from Rasuwa-1 constituency, representing Nepali Congress. He defeated his nearest rival Janardan Dhakal by more than 4,000 votes. He is also a member of the House Public Accounts Committee.

References

Living people
Nepali Congress politicians from Bagmati Province
21st-century Nepalese people
Place of birth missing (living people)
Nepal MPs 2017–2022
People from Rasuwa District
1977 births
Nepal MPs 2022–present